Caladenia necrophylla, commonly known as late green-comb spider orchid, is a species of orchid endemic to South Australia. It has a single leaf and a single yellowish-green flower with red lines along the sepals and petals. It is unusual in that the leaf has completely withered before the flower opens, and sometimes even before the flower spike appears.

Description 
Caladenia necrophylla is a terrestrial, perennial, deciduous, herb with an underground tuber. The lateral sepals and petals spread widely but curve downwards. There are four crowded rows of dark red calli up to  longin the centre of the labellum. Flowering occurs from November to December.

Taxonomy and naming 
Caladenia necrophylla was first described in 1991 by David Jones from a specimen collected near Robe and the description was published in Australian Orchid Research. The specific epithet (necrophylla) is derived from the Ancient Greek words nekros meaning "a dead body" and phyllon meaning "a leaf", referring to the leaf withering before the flower opens.

Distribution and habitat 
The late green-comb spider orchid occurs in the south east of South Australia where it grows in mallee woodland.

Conservation
Caladenia necrophylla is described as "rare" in South Australia.

References 

necrophylla
Orchids of South Australia
Endemic orchids of Australia
Plants described in 1998
Taxa named by David L. Jones (botanist)